Frøydis or Freydis is a Norwegian female first name. 
It is from the Norse god Frøya's name and dís (goddess).

People with the given name 
Frøydis
Frøydis Armand
Frøydis Ree Wekre
Freydis
Freydís Eiríksdóttir

See also 
Freyja
Freya (given name)
Dís

Norwegian feminine given names
Icelandic feminine given names